Verner is an  unincorporated community in Logan County, West Virginia, United States. It lies at an altitude of 781 feet (238 m).

Etymology

The origin of the name Verner is obscure, but it may be derived from the surname Varner.

References 

Unincorporated communities in Logan County, West Virginia
Unincorporated communities in West Virginia
Populated places on the Guyandotte River